Fabrizia Pons (born 26 June 1955) is an Italian rally co-driver best known for her partnership with Michèle Mouton.

Biography
The pair won four rallies with the Rallye Sanremo in 1981 and a further three to finish second in the 1982 championship. Pons is one of two people to have achieved world championship points as a driver and co-driver, having finished ninth overall in the 1978 Sanremo Rally before switching to co-driving. Pons is a recipient of the Halda Trophy for 1982, the highest honor for a co-driver.

From 2003 to 2006, she was the co-driver to German Dakar Rally racer Jutta Kleinschmidt.

Personal life
Pons has two children and is originally from Turin.

WRC victories

Notes

References

External links
 Fabrizia Pons – Career Statistics

Living people
Racing drivers from Turin
1955 births
Italian rally drivers
Female rally drivers
Italian rally co-drivers
Dakar Rally co-drivers
Italian female racing drivers